Thomas Chandler Haliburton (17 December 1796 – 27 August 1865) was a Nova Scotian politician, judge, and author. He made an important political contribution to the state of Nova Scotia before its entry into Confederation of Canada. He was the first international best-selling author of fiction from what is now Canada. In 1856, he immigrated to England, where he served as a Conservative Member of Parliament. He was the father of the British civil servant Lord Haliburton and of the anthropologist Robert Grant Haliburton.

Life
On 17 December 1796, Thomas Chandler Haliburton was born in Windsor, Nova Scotia, to William Hersey Otis Haliburton, a lawyer, judge and political figure, and Lucy Chandler Grant. His mother died when he was a small child. When Thomas was seven, his father married Susanna Davis, the daughter of Michael Francklin, who had been Nova Scotia's Lieutenant Governor. He attended University of King's College in Windsor, from which he graduated in 1815. Later he became a lawyer and opened a practice in Annapolis Royal, the former capital of the colony.

Haliburton attained distinction as a local businessman and as a judge, but his greatest fame came from his published writings. He wrote a number of books on history, politics, and farm improvement. He first rose to international fame with his Clockmaker serial, which first appeared in the Novascotian and was later published as a book throughout the British Empire, as popular light reading. The work recounted the humorous adventures of the main character, Sam Slick.

In 1816, Haliburton married Lousia Nevill, daughter of Captain Laurence Neville, of the Eighth Light Dragoons.

Between 1826 and 1829, Haliburton represented Annapolis County in the Nova Scotia House of Assembly.

Relations with English Burton family
Thomas Chandler Haliburton resided in England from 1837, where he was hosted and entertained in London by his cousins Decimus Burton, Jane Burton, James Burton, the Egyptologist, Septimus Burton, the solicitor, Octavia Burton, and Jessy Burton. Thomas asked James Burton, the Egyptologist, to check the proofs of his work Letter Bag of the Great Western, with which Burton was unimpressed, in 1839, and those of the third series of The Clockmaker in 1840. The pair travelled together to Scotland to investigate their common ancestry, and intended to tour Canada and the United States of America together. Thomas Chandler Haliburton's daughter, Susannah, was impressed by James Burton, the Egyptologist: she wrote, in 1839, "Mr James I admire very much. He is one of the most well-bred persons I saw &... decidedly the flower of the flock".

Retirement and subsequent life

In 1856, Thomas Chandler Haliburton retired from law and moved to England. In the same year, he married Sarah Harriet Owen Williams. In 1859, Haliburton was elected the Member of Parliament for Launceston, Cornwall as a member of the Conservative minority. He did not stand for re-election in 1865.

Haliburton received an honorary degree from Oxford for his services to literature. He continued writing until his death on August 27, 1865 at his home in Isleworth, near London and is buried in All Saints' churchyard.

Family

While in England, Thomas Chandler Haliburton met Louisa Neville, daughter of Captain Laurence Neville, of the Eighth Light Dragoons. In 1816, he married her, soon thereafter returning to Nova Scotia with her. Louisa's story before marriage is related in the "Haliburton Chaplet," edited by their son, Robert Grant Haliburton (Toronto: 1899). The couple had two sons and five daughters: 
Susannah Lucy Anne, later Weldon, 1817–1899, ceramic collector
Mrs. A. F. Haliburton
Mrs. Bainbridge Smith
Amelia (25 Jul 1829 – 14 Jan 1902), landscape artist, married the Rev. Edwin Gilpin, Dean of Nova Scotia, in 1849; the couple had four sons and one daughter, including Edwin Gilpin (1850–1907), a mining engineer and author
Robert Grant Haliburton, Q.C., D.C.L., 1831–1901, lawyer, author, and anthropologist
Arthur (1832–1907), later 1st Baron Haliburton, G.C.B., British civil servant
Laura Charlotte, artist, married William Cunard, son of the shipping magnate Sir Samuel Cunard at Windsor, Nova Scotia, 30 December 1851; three sons, one daughter. Exhibited her pictures at the Royal Academy, the Gallery of British Artists, and at other institutions in London.

In 1840, Louisa died and was buried at Windsor.

Legacy
Haliburton was eager to promote immigration to the colonies of British North America. One of his first written works was an emigrant's guide to Nova Scotia published in 1823, A General Description of Nova Scotia; Illustrated by a New and Correct Map The community of Haliburton, Nova Scotia was named after him. In Ontario, Haliburton County is named after Haliburton in recognition of his work as the first chair of the Canadian Land and Emigration Company.

In 1884, faculty and students at his alma mater founded a literary society in honour of the College's most celebrated man of letters. The Haliburton Society, still active at the University of King's College, Halifax, is the longest-standing collegial literary society throughout the Commonwealth of Nations and North America.

The mention "hurly on the long pond on the ice", which appears in the second volume of The Attaché, or Sam Slick in England, a work of fiction published in 1844, has been interpreted by some as a reference to an ice-hockey-like game he may have played during his years at King's College. It is the basis of Windsor's disputed claim to being the town that fathered hockey.

In 1902, a memorial to Haliburton and his first wife was erected in Christ Church, Windsor, Nova Scotia, by four of their children: Laura Cunard, Lord Haliburton, and two surviving sisters.

Nova Scotian artist William Valentine painted Haliburton's portrait. His former home in Windsor is preserved as a museum.

Works
A General Description of Nova Scotia - 1823
 An Historical and Statistical Account of Nova Scotia - 1829]The Clockmaker - 1836The Clockmaker, 2nd Series - 1838The Bubbles of Canada - 1839[https://archive.org/details/cihm_36503 A Reply to the Report of the Earl of Durham - 1839
The Letter-Bag of the Great Western - 1840
The Clockmaker, 3rd Series - 1840
The Attaché; or Sam Slick in England - 1843
The Attaché; or Sam Slick in England, 2nd Series - 1844
The Old Judge, Or Life in a Colony - 1849
The English in America - 1851
Rule and Misrule in English America - 1851 vol 1 vol 2
Sam Slick's Wise Saws and Modern Instances - 1853
The Americans at Home; or, Byways, Backwoods, and Prairies - 1855
Nature and Human Nature - 1855
The Season-Ticket* - 1860
Maxims of an Old Stager Not by Haliburton, but pseudonym may be "Sam Slick"

References

Further reading

External links

The Haliburton Club (archived 27 September 2007)
Photos of 1937 plaque by Historic Sites and Monuments Board (archived 24 April 2011)
Haliburton House Museum (archived 19 November 2011)

Electronic editions

1796 births
1865 deaths
19th-century Canadian novelists
19th-century Canadian historians
Canadian humorists
Canadian male novelists
Canadian people of Scottish descent
Colony of Nova Scotia people
Conservative Party (UK) MPs for English constituencies
Historians of Atlantic Canada
Judges in Nova Scotia
Members of the Parliament of the United Kingdom for Launceston
Nova Scotia pre-Confederation MLAs
People from Windsor, Nova Scotia
Persons of National Historic Significance (Canada)
People from Hants County, Nova Scotia
UK MPs 1859–1865
University of King's College alumni
Writers from Nova Scotia